Didar Zhalmukan (born 22 May 1996 in Kazakhstan) is a Kazakhstani footballer who plays for Kaisar in the Kazakhstan Premier League.

Career
Zhalmukan started his senior career with Aktobe. In 2017, he signed for Astana in the Kazakhstan Premier League, where he has made twenty-eight appearances and scored five goals. After that, he played for Tobol, and Atyrau.

References

External links
 "By talent, he is one of the best in Kazakhstan." Will Zhalmukan restart his career in Astana?
 Didar Zhalmukan: "Ready to fight for a place in the team"
 Didar Zhalmukan: “Football is fair, you can’t deceive it”
 Didar Zhalmukan: “If the national team coaches consider that they need me, then, of course, it will be an honor for me”
 Didar Zhalmukan: “Everyone wanted to take revenge”

1996 births
People from Aktobe Region
Living people
Kazakhstani footballers
Kazakhstan youth international footballers
Kazakhstan under-21 international footballers
Association football midfielders
FC Aktobe players
FC Astana players
FC Tobol players
FC Atyrau players
Kazakhstan Premier League players